Warren Chivers (December 12, 1914 – August 18, 2006) was an American cross-country skier. He competed in the men's 18 kilometre event at the 1936 Winter Olympics.

References

1914 births
2006 deaths
American male cross-country skiers
Olympic cross-country skiers of the United States
Cross-country skiers at the 1936 Winter Olympics
People from Hanover, New Hampshire